RBS TV is a Southern Brazilian television network owned by Grupo RBS, and one of the oldest Rede Globo affiliates. The acronym originally stood for Rede Brasil Sul de Televisão (English: "Brazil South Television Network"), but currently the network never uses its full name on-air.

RBS TV owns 12 television stations in Rio Grande do Sul. RBS TV Porto Alegre is the headquarters for the network.

RBS TV stations produce an average amount of local and regional programming, composed mainly of news, but also drama series, documentaries, sports, variety and youth programming.

History

 
TV Gaúcha was created in 1962 in Porto Alegre, Rio Grande do Sul, and would later become RBS TV Porto Alegre. The following year, TV Gaúcha affiliated itself with Rede Excelsior. Rede Globo was launched in Rio de Janeiro two years later, but TV Gaúcha would only become its affiliate in 1967.

In 1979, it started to operate in Florianópolis, the capital city of Santa Catarina. This new purchase obliged the network to change its name to something less Rio Grande do Sul-related (as the word "Gaúcha" was), and it was rebranded RBS TV that same year.

Broadcasters members

Rio Grande do Sul

Santa Catarina (formerly)
RBS TV Florianópolis (Florianópolis) - 12
RBS TV Blumenau (Blumenau) -  3
RBS TV Centro-Oeste (Joaçaba) - 6
RBS TV Chapecó (Chapecó) - 11
RBS TV Criciúma (Criciúma) - 9
RBS TV Joinville (Joinville) - 5

Corporate slogans (translated to English) 

 1962-1963 Rio Grande's living image.
1987-1992: A station serving the community.
1996-2000: All for You.
2000-2003: We show, you see.
2003-2008: Your Life on TV.
2008-2012: We do it for you.
2012-2015: We do it with you.
2015-2019: The TV connects us.
2019–present: Well for you.

Inquiry on RBS Group oligopoly / monopoly practicing
The RBS Group is being investigated by the practice of oligopoly / monopoly. In 2008, the Federal Prosecutor of Santa Catarina has filed a public civil action (Case No.. 2008.72.00.014043-5) against the company oligopoly Rede Brasil Sul (RBS) in southern Brazil. The MPF requires the company, among other measures, to reducing its number of TV and radion stations in the states of Santa Catarina (SC) and Rio Grande do Sul (RS), so that to be in according to the Brazilian law; and the cancellation of the purchase of the newspaper A Notícia from Joinville, consummated in 2006 - which resulted in a virtual monopoly over the relevant newspapers in the state of Santa Catarina.

In 2009, the Federal Prosecutor in Canoas (RS), Pedro Antonio Roso, asked the chairman of the RBS Group, Nelson Pacheco Sirotsky, among other informations, the number of TV and radio stations that the company owns in Rio Grande do Sul, "as well as its affiliates, stations and repeaters." The request is part of an administrative proceeding brought by federal prosecutors "to determine possible occurrence of monopolistic practices and irregularities in granting Radio and Television to the RBS Group in Rio Grande do Sul".

Notes

External links
Official Site 
Grupo RBS official site 

Television networks in Brazil
Grupo RBS
TV Globo affiliates
Mass media in Porto Alegre
Companies based in Rio Grande do Sul
Portuguese-language television networks
Television channels and stations established in 1962
Television channels and stations disestablished in 1992
1962 establishments in Brazil
1992 disestablishments in Brazil